Rabbi Chaim Mordechai Aizik Hodakov (12 January 1902 – 23 April 1993) was the chief of staff of the secretariat of the Lubavitcher Rebbe, Rabbi Menachem Mendel Schneerson for more than 40 years. From 1950, until his death, Hodakov served as chairman of Agudas Chasidei Chabad, the umbrella organization of the Chabad-Lubavitch movement.

Early life

Chaim Mordechai Aizik was born in the Russian town of Beshenkowitz on January 12, 1902 to Sholom Yisroel and Chaya Treina Hodakov.  He moved to Riga, Latvia with his parents in 1904. There he was raised in the ways of the Navahrudak Mussar movement, as taught by Rabbi Yoel Barantchik. The young Chodakov excelled in his devotion to Torah study, and in his piety and refined character.

An educator and pedagogue, young Chaim Mordechai was appointed principal of the Torah V'Derech Eretz school in Riga at the age of 18.  While still a young man, in 1934, he was appointed the inspector of Jewish schools by the Latvian Ministry of Education. His close ties (through Mordehai Dubin) with the dictatorial regime of Karlis Ulmanis, and his strict orthodoxy, accompanied by the radical antisocialism and mass lock-outs of left-orientated teachers caused him to be unpopular with the secular circles of Latvian Jewry.

Involvement in Lubavitch 

When the sixth Lubavitcher Rebbe, Rabbi Yosef Yitzchok Schneersohn, moved to Riga (from Russia) in 1928, Rabbi Hodakov became drawn to the Rebbe and joined the Rebbe's staff.  It was during that period that he became acquainted with Rabbi Menachem Mendel Schneerson, Rabbi Yosef Yitzchok's son-in-law, for the first time.

In 1940, when the sixth Rebbe escaped from Poland, he asked Rabbi and Mrs. Hodakov to accompany him to the United States. They were one of only a few families who received this privilege and became part of the sixth Rebbe's official entourage.  Some time after their arrival in the United States, in 1942, the Previous Rebbe appointed him as director of Merkos L'Inyonei Chinuch (the educational arm of the Lubavitch movement), Mahane Israel (Chabad) (the social service arm), and Kehot Publication Society.

Role as secretary

In 1950, when Rabbi Menachem Mendel Schneerson ascended to the helm of the worldwide Chabad-Lubavitch movement, Hodakov became his Chief-of-Staff and head of his secretariat.  He was later appointed chairman of Agudas Chasidei Chabad, the umbrella organization that oversees the worldwide network of Chabad-Lubavitch organizations and institutions.

Hodakov innovated many educational ideas and programs.  His advice is compiled in a book on education entitled "The Educator's Handbook."  He was a role model for many young Chassidim in his demeanor and in his devotion to the Rebbe.

Hodakov gave much thought to spiritual conditions in the Land of Israel and sent constant directives to the Lubavitch School Network in Israel (Reshet Oholei Yosef Yitzchok – Lubavitch) and other institutions there.

Death

He died on April 23, 1993, after a brief illness.  The funeral, which was held on Sunday, April 25, was attended by several thousand people, many of whom had managed to fly in from various parts of the United States.  The procession filed past Lubavitch World Headquarters in the Crown Heights section of Brooklyn, and proceeded to the Montefiore Cemetery, in Springfield Gardens, New York.  He was interred near the resting place of the previous Rebbe.

His wife, Etel Tzerna, a noted educator and author, died on June 17, 2006.  They are survived by two children: son Sholom Yisroel and daughter Chaya Rivkah Kramer, and numerous grandchildren and great-grandchildren.

References

External links
A Biography of Rabbi Hodakov from Chabad.org
12th Anniversary of the Passing of Rabbi Hodakov
A Small Man with Great Advice
A Talk with Rabbi Hodakov on Education - Perspectives magazine

Chabad-Lubavitch rabbis
1902 births
1993 deaths
American Hasidic rabbis
Hasidic rabbis in Europe
Latvian Orthodox rabbis
Russian Hasidic rabbis